Malpura is a town with municipality in Tonk district in the Indian state of Rajasthan. Malpura is known for its Dadabadi, built by the Khartargach Sect of Shewtambar Jain in memory of 3rd Dada Gurudev Shri Jinkushalsurishwarji.Malpura is popular visiting palace in Rajasthan.

Geography
It has an average elevation of 132 metres (401 feet).
Distance from Jaipur 90 km, Malpura is also Known for Avikanagar – 4 km from Malpura. It is famous for the Central Sheep and Wool Research Institute (CSWRI).

Transport
Malpura is situated on by a two-lane state Highway (SH-12) Jaipur-Malpura - Kekri - Bhilwara. Also on State Highway (37A) Diggi- Malpura- Todaraisingh- Chhan. Malpura is well connected by Road Transport. State Roadways buses run regularly here. Buses to Jaipur, Ajmer, Bhilwara, Tonk, Kekri, Shahpura are available from here. The erstwhile Metre Gauge railway line from Jaipur to Todaraisingh via Renwal-Phagi-Diggi-Malpura was functional. The line used to had regular train service from 1892 to 1992. In 1992 the Metre Gauge railway tracks was uprooted for gauge conversion to Broad Gauge. The Railway had not handled the track for the future Broad Gauge train services. Hence currently Malpura is not connected by Rail network since 1992 and thus the nearest Railway Station is Sanganer,  from Jaipur, in Jaipur District And Kishangarh,  from Ajmer in Ajmer District. Jaipur international Airport is 70 km from Malpura.

Notable sights

 Onn mataji temple.
Shri Kalyan Temple Diggi - a famous temple which is 15 km from Malpura. Here a very ancient temple of god Kalyan (Vishnu) built by king Digva is present.
Malpura Municipality is headed by Smt. Sonia Manish Soni
 Gunat Mata Temple [Dhola Ka Kheda]
 Bisalpur Dam - situated 48 km from Malpura. It is one of the important dams project in Rajasthan built across Banas river.
 Sindholiya temple
 Lamba harisingh
Beriya Balaji
 Avikanagar. It is the largest sheep research centre of India located 5 km from Malpura along the Jaipur road. Kendriya Vidyalaya Avikanagar from 1st to 12th standard and Government Secondary School Avikanagar from 6th to 10th standard are also situated in the CSWRI Avikanagar campus. The director of CSWRI Avikanagar is Dr S.M.K Naqvi, who is the National fellow of National agricultural research system. He is known for his contribution in the field of small ruminant research.
Ghati Balaji
 Malpura is famous for its Jain Dadabadi and Adinath Jain temple.
 An important temple, Malpura dadabadi of Dada Jinkushalsuriji is there.
It has one Government hospital & many private hospital such as Rekha Devi Memorial Hospital and a nursing college.
 Rajasthan patrika founder late Shri Karpoor Chandra Kulish is from nearby Soda village.
⌊ Sindoliya Mataji Ramphool singh⌉

Villages in Malpura Mandal
Atoli, Awada, Barol, Chabrana, Chainpura, Chandsen, Chanvanndia, Desma, Devel, Dhola Ka Kheda, Dholi, Diggi, Dungri Kala, Ganwer, Hathgi, Indoli, Jhadali, Kacholia, Kadila, Kalmanda, Kantoli, Kirawal, Kurad, Lambaharising, Lawa, Malikpur, Morla, Bagri, Nagar, Pachewar, Parli, Rajpura, Rendiliya, Sindoliya, Sitarampura, Soda, Bambori, Pratppura, Ajmeri, Bawari, Sitarampura, Sodabawari, Tilanjoo, Tordi, Shree Gopalpura, Kalmanda, Malooni

 Soda village is famous for being first internet panchayat in India. Chhavi Rajawat is the youngest women sarpanch of her village soda. Soda is also the birthplace of Shri Ramcharan Ji Maharaj.
 Diggi is famous for ancient "Shri Kalyandhani Mandir".
 Dhola Ka Kheda village have an ancient hindu temple called "Gunat Mata Mandir"
 Kirawal village Have a temple the goddess ma sati
 Tordi village have a great dam known as Tordi sagar which made in 1887 The Dam is 1772 meter length and 14.2 meter height
 Chainpura Village have a great temple of veer Teja Ji.

References

Cities and towns in Tonk district